Robert Paul Preston (born December 1, 1982) is an American former professional basketball player.

College basketball
Preston played college basketball at University of Akron. During the 2003–2004 season he averaged 2.0 points and 1.7 rebounds in 8.0 minutes per contest. In 2004-2005 he played 16.5 minutes per game, averaging 4.6 points, 2.8 rebounds and 1.2 assists, shooting .405 from three point territory. In the 2005–2006 campaign, he played 24.5 minutes a game, averaging 8.0 points, 3.9 rebounds, 1.5 assists and 1.2 blocks.

Professional career
In August 2006, Preston signed a contract with Bulgarian club BC Levski Sofia. In 2006–2007 he averaged 10.6 points, 6.1 rebounds and 1.1 assists in 27 minutes per game in the Bulgarian first league - Men's A-1.

After two years with BC Levski Sofia he joined Spartak Pleven. In 37 appearances, 36 as a starter he was averaging 13.9 points, 6.5 rebounds and 0.9 assists in 28.8 minutes per game. He shot 60%FG and 39.7% 3PT. He was named All-Star Game MVP.

Preston started the 2009-2010 season with Spartak Pleven, but at mid-season transferred to another Bulgarian club - Rilski Sportist. In 47 games this season, including 33 starts, he averaged 12.1 points, 5.2 rebounds and 1.1 assists. He shot 58% for 2 points and 36% for 3. His best game of the season was in the EUROHOLD Balkan League, against CSA Steaua Turabo in Bucharest, when he scored 33 points, shooting 9/10 for 2 points and 4/8 for three, along with 9 rebounds and 4 assists.

Personal life
Following retirement from professional basketball, Preston joined Total Quality Logistics out of Cincinnati, OH where he has been employed since 2013 as a Logistics Coordinator and Barista. 

He currently spends much of his free time drinking peach topped Bad Juans at Elsa's, and whiskey at home. In 2019 Preston and his wife had their first child, who is already taller than most people in the office where he works. Preston enjoys sharing Chipotle and Chick-fil-A gift cards with his friends, and even new co-workers. 

On May 27, 2021, Robert was separated from long-time team member Charles, who was moved to a new office. They will remain on the on the same team, but it just won't be the same over Skype.

Bulgarian League statistics

External links
Eurobasket.com Profile
EUROHOLD Balkan League Profile

1982 births
Living people
Akron Zips men's basketball players
American expatriate basketball people in Bulgaria
American men's basketball players
BC Levski Sofia players
BC Rilski Sportist players
People from Lynchburg, Ohio
Power forwards (basketball)
Small forwards